Janet Walker  is a Chartered Arbitrator with offices in Toronto, Canada (Toronto Arbitration Chambers), London, England (Atkin Chambers) and Sydney, Australia (Sydney Arbitration Chambers). She is a Canadian scholar and author in the fields of Private International Law and Civil Procedure at Osgoode Hall Law School. She is also a Distinguished Research Professor at York University. Walker is married to Australian lawyer and international arbitrator, Doug Jones AO.

Education and teaching 

Walker received B.A. (Hons.) and M.A. degrees from York University (1979, 1982); an LL.B. degree from Osgoode Hall Law School (1993, J.D. 2012); and a DPhil from Oxford University (2002) (M.A 2010). She is a Professor and past Associate Dean at Osgoode Hall Law School, York University, where she teaches 
Conflict of Laws, Class Actions and International Arbitration. Walker was the recipient of a Teaching Award in 2010 for her outstanding contributions to the Osgoode Professional Masters Program. She coached the Osgoode Hall team for the Willem C. Vis Moot during 2001-2014, including when it won the competition in 2004, and has sat as Arbitrator for the competition from 2001 to present. In 2020, Janet received the title of Distinguished Research Professor from York University for her commitment to excellence, and international leadership in the fields of private international law, procedural law, comparative law and international commercial arbitration.

Walker has also taught as a visiting scholar at a number of universities including:  
 Monash University;
 New York University as part of the Hauser Global Law Faculty;
 University of Toronto;
 University of Haifa;
 Oxford University as the Leverhulme Visiting Professor;
 National University of Singapore at the joint program with New York University;
 Institute in International Commercial Law and Dispute Resolution in Zagreb and Zadar, Croatia; and
 Faculté des sciences juridiques, sociales et politiques de Tunis  (Foreign Research Professor).

Career

Author 

Walker is an author and scholar in private international law and procedure. She has authored more than 60 peer reviewed articles, as well as contributing to a number of text books and other works. She is the author of the current edition of Canadian Conflict of Laws (LexisNexis, 6th edition 2005+), which has been cited more than 400 times in Canadian courts and described as "the most cited private law work in Canadian jurisprudence", and was co-author of the previous edition. She is also the author of the Conflict of Laws volume of Halsbury's Laws of Canada (LexisNexis Canada, 1st issue and subsequent issues 2006; 2011; 2016; 2020), General Editor of The Civil Litigation Process (6th-9th eds, Emond Montgomery, 2005; 2010; 2015; 2020), General Editor of Class Actions in Canada (1st and 2nd eds, Emond, 2013, 2018), Co-editor of Private International Law in Common Law Canada (3rd-5th eds, Emond Montgomery, 2010; 2016; 2023), co-author of Civil Litigation (Irwin, 2010) and co-editor of Common Law, Civil Law and the Future of Categories (LexisNexis, 2010). Walker is an Executive Editor of the Canadian Journal of Commercial Arbitration.

Arbitrator 

Walker is a Fellow and Chartered Arbitrator of the Chartered Institute of Arbitrators (CIArb). She is a member at Toronto Arbitration Chambers, a door tenant at Atkin Chambers, London, and member at Sydney Arbitration Chambers. She is a past Chair of the ICC Canada, and serves as a member of the ICC Commission, Honorary Secretary General of the International Association of Procedural Law, an Executive Board Member of CIArb Canada, and as a Board Member at the International Construction Law Association. She was the founding chair of the Toronto Chapter of CIArb, the Arbitration Roundtable of Toronto, (now the Toronto Commercial Arbitration Society "TCAS"),  a member of Arbitralwomen, and a Freeman of the City of London at the Worshipful Company of Arbitrators.

Walker's arbitration matters include disputes relating to construction, distribution agreements, licenses, franchises, agricultural manufacturing, intellectual property, mergers and acquisitions, heavy equipment sales, employment, manufacturing supply agreements, and pharmaceuticals. She has served as sole arbitrator, chair and co-arbitrator in arbitration under the institutional rules of the International Chamber of Commerce (ICC), Dubai International Arbitration Centre (DIAC), Singapore International Arbitration Centre (SIAC), Hong Kong International Arbitration Centre (HKIAC), London Court of International Arbitration (LCIA) and the International Centre for Dispute Resolution (ICDR), Permanent Court of Arbitration (PCA) as well as ad hoc arbitrations. She is a member of several institutional panels including those of the American Arbitration Association (AAA), Australian Centre for International Commercial Arbitration (ACICA), Asian International Arbitration Centre (AIAC), British Virgin Islands International Arbitration Centre (BVI IAC),Chartered Institute of Arbitrators (CIArb) Presidential Panel, Chinese International Economic and Trade Arbitration Commission (CIETAC), Hong Kong International Arbitration Centre (HKIAC), Japan Commercial Arbitration Association (JCAA), Korean Commercial Arbitration Board International (KCAB),  London Court of International Arbitration (LCIA), Shanghai International Arbitration Center (SHIAC), Shenzhen Commission on International Arbitration (SCIA), Singapore International Arbitration Centre (SIAC) and of the former Canadian National Committee of the International Chamber of Commerce. She is also a Recommended Arbitrator at the Ukrainian Chamber of International Commercial Arbitration (UCICA), a panel member of the London Chamber of Arbitration and Mediation (LCAM) as well as a member of the Arbitration Roundtable of Toronto, and the ILA Committee on International Commercial Arbitration. Walker also served as a member of the organising committee of ICCA Sydney 2018 and is Founder and Co-Chair of CanArbWeek.

Expert/Consultant 
For more than twenty years, Janet consulted and provided expert evidence on questions of jurisdiction, judgments and applicable law in 60+ crossborder disputes. She has also offered expert assistance to members of the profession in the public and private sectors in Canada, the United States, the United Kingdom and Australia.

Advisory Roles 

Walker was the common law advisor to the Federal Courts (Canada) Rules Committee from 2006-2015. She is Secretary General of the International Association of Procedural Law, and is a former president of the Canadian branch of the International Law Association. Walker was the CIArb Academic Advisor in 2014-2015 and she is a member of the Scientific Advisory Board, Max Planck Institute Luxembourg as well as the Global Advisory Board, New York International Arbitration Center.

She has also served as a member on a wide variety of international and Canadian task forces and working groups including:
 Unidroit/American Law Institute Project on Transnational Principles and Rules of Procedure;
 Uniform Law Conference of Canada National Class Action Reform Project;
 International Bar Association Task Force on International Procedures and Protocols for Collective Redress; 
 American Bar Association, Litigation Section Working Group on Protocols for Parallel Class Actions;
 International Law Association Committee on International Arbitration; 
 Toronto Commercial Arbitration Society Commercial Arbitration Act Reform Working Group; and
 Uniform Law Conference of Canada - International Arbitration Legislation Project, Advisory Board.

Honours and awards 

Walker has been among the Arbitration Lawyers recognised in Who’s Who Legal Canada and Who’s Who Legal International since 2010, Who’s Who Legal, and Best Lawyers since 2008. In 2018, she received the CIArb Canada Distinguished Service Medal.

Walker was a member of the Canadian Forces Primary Reserve 1977-2014 and of the Supplementary Ready Reserve 2014-2019 and has received the Canadian Forces Decoration, the Land Force Central Area Commander’s Award of Excellence and the Governor General's Horse Guards Commanding Officer and Regimental Sergeant Major’s Award of Excellence. She is the longest serving and highest ranking female non-commissioned member in the Regiment and was its first female Bandmaster. Walker has received the Queen's Diamond Jubilee Medal (2012),  the Queen's Golden Jubilee Medal (2002), the Viscount Bennett Fellowship (1995), and the Osgoode Hall Law School Silver Medal (1993).

In 2020, Walker received the title of Distinguished Research Professor from York University for her commitment to excellence, and international leadership in the fields of private international law, procedural law, comparative law and international commercial arbitration. In December 2021, she was appointed to the Order of Canada for her expert legal authority in commercial arbitration and conflict of laws, and for advancing legal procedural standards in Canada.

Memberships 

Walker is a member of the University Club of Toronto and of the Athenaeum Club, London, and a Senior Fellow of Massey College, Toronto. She is an elected member of the American Law Institute, the International Academy of Commercial and Consumer Law and The Advocate’s Society. She is also a member of the Bar of Ontario, the Law Society of Upper Canada, the Canadian Bar Association, the International Bar Association and the London Court of International Arbitration. In 2021, Walker joined Atkin Chambers as a door tenant.

References 

Year of birth missing (living people)
Living people
York University alumni
Osgoode Hall Law School alumni
Canadian legal scholars
Members of the Order of Canada